Jaani Babu Qawwal also known as Jaani Babu was a legendary Indian sufi and qawwali singer. He was born in 1935 in Hinganghat. He was born as Jan Mohammad Jani Babu. He is known for his work on Shankar Shambhu (1976), Mitti (2001) and Market (2003).

He died on 28 January 2008.

Jani Babu's most popular qawwalis are Le gayi dil mera manchali khalli walli , Raat abhi Baaki hai baat abhi baaki hai and Mehengai maar gayi.

Discography

References 

1935 births
2008 deaths
Indian qawwali singers
People from Wardha district
Indian Sufis